"Call and Answer" is a song by the Canadian group Barenaked Ladies. It was the third single from their highly successful 1998 album Stunt (the song "Alcohol" had been previously released to radio stations, but was not sold commercially as a single). When released as a single, the song was both remixed and edited into a radio mix which cut from the second verse to the third chorus, skipping a chorus, an instrumental break and the third verse. The remix was a slight adjustment of EQ and levels; not a comprehensive remix involving adding or replacing musical elements. This version was also included on the soundtrack for the film EdTV.

The song was written by Steven Page and his longtime collaborator, Stephen Duffy. All of the vocals in the song are performed by Page; this includes overlapping vocals, harmonies and octaves, and a call-and-response chorus. This, in addition to a long ad-lib outro makes the song a showcase of Page's vocal abilities. In live performances, the backing vocals were performed by bandmates Ed Robertson and Jim Creeggan. The song seems to be about the reconciliation of a tumultuous relationship.

The song was performed on CBC Radio as a tribute to Peter Gzowski on his death in 2002. It was also performed as a duet with Alanis Morissette in 2004 during the co-headlining Au Naturale Tour.

Music video
The video for the song utilized the shorter, radio mix version, and involved the band living in a world of duplicates. All the houses look the same, all the cars are white Volkswagen New Beetles, and there are several "copies" of each band member. Notably, there are multiple Stevens that sing the multiple vocal lines he sings on the song. Steve is the main band member seen in the video, and the other band members are only in a few shots. Steve is paired with a female character in the video.

The video was shot in the Valencia section of Santa Clarita, California. A second version of the video includes scenes from the film EdTV.

The video for the song was an Easter egg on the install disc for Mac OS 9-9.2, along with the video for Static X's "Push It".

Personnel
 Steven Page – lead vocals
 Ed Robertson – acoustic and electric guitars, backing vocals 
 Jim Creeggan – double bass, cello, backing vocals 
 Kevin Hearn – piano, synthesizer, backing vocals 
 Tyler Stewart – drums, percussion, backing vocals

Chart positions

Weekly charts

Year-end charts

References

1999 singles
Barenaked Ladies songs
Songs written by Stephen Duffy
Songs written by Steven Page
1998 songs
Reprise Records singles